The Journal of Cultural Economy is a bimonthly peer-reviewed academic journal covering cultural and economic sociology. It was established in 2008 and is published by Routledge. The editors-in-chief are Liz McFall (Open University) and Taylor Nelms (University of California, Irvine). According to the Journal Citation Reports, the journal has a 2017 impact factor of 0.944.

References

External links

Editors' website

Publications established in 2008
Sociology journals
Routledge academic journals
English-language journals
Bimonthly journals
Economic sociology